

Events 
Innocentio Alberti takes up a position as cornettist at the Este court in Ferrara, following the dissolution of the Accademia degli Elevati in Padua.

Publications 
Ippolito Chamaterò – First book of madrigals for five voices (Venice: Antonio Gardano)
Jacob Clemens non Papa – Tenth book of masses:  for four voices (Leuven: Pierre Phalèse), published posthumously
Claude Goudimel – Fourth book of psalms for four and five voices (Paris: Le Roy & Ballard)
Orlande de Lassus
Fourth book of chansons for five and six voices (Louvain: Pierre Phalèse)
First book of madrigals for four voices (Rome: Valerio Dorico)
Giovanni Paolo Paladino — First book of lute tablature, containing arrangements of pieces by various composers (Lyon: Simon Gorlier)
Francesco Portinaro – Fourth book of madrigals for five voices (Venice: Antonio Gardano)
Christoph Praetorius –  for four voices (Wittenberg: Georg Rhau), a funeral motet for Philip Melanchthon

Sacred music

Secular music

Births 
January 29 – Scipione Dentice, keyboard composer (died 1633)
August 10 – Hieronymus Praetorius, north German composer and organist (died 1629)
date unknown
William Brade, German composer of dance forms of the period (died 1630)
Antonio Coma, Italian composer (died 1629) 
Peter Philips (c.1560/1561), eminent English composer, organist, and Catholic priest (died 1628), the most published English composer in his time.
 probable
Giovanni Croce, Venetian composer (died 1609)
Lodovico Grossi da Viadana, Italian composer (died 1627)

Deaths 
date unknown – Louis Bourgeois, composer of Calvinist hymn-tunes (born c.1510)
probable
Marco Antonio Cavazzoni, organist and composer (born c.1490)
Nicolas Gombert, composer (born c.1495)

 
Music
16th century in music
Music by year